

Brookland Valley Estate (often referred to simply as Brookland Valley) is an Australian winery at Wilyabrup, in the Margaret River wine region of Western Australia.  Australian wine writer Ray Jordan has described its vineyard as one of Australia's showpieces; another writer, James Halliday, considers its Flutes Café to be one of the best winery restaurants in the region.

See also

 Australian wine
 List of wineries in Western Australia
 Western Australian wine

References

Notes

Bibliography

External links
 – official site

Wineries in Western Australia
Wilyabrup, Western Australia
Food and drink companies established in 1984
1984 establishments in Australia